Aleram (died 991) was the first Marquis of Montferrat and Liguria (the marca Aleramica) in Northern Italy until his death. He was son of William I of Montferrat and is mentioned in documents for the first time in 933 when he received a fief near Vercelli by Hugh of Italy. In 955 he was invested of lands in what is now the province of Alessandria.

Life 
In 958 he was appointed as Marquis by  Berengar II of Italy, whose daughter Gerberga he had married. Three years later, however, Aleram sided for emperor Otto I, who gave him further lands in the Langhe and from  the Tanaro, the Orba and the Ligurian Sea. The new grants had been favoured by Adelaide of Burgundy, wife of Otto I from 951 and previous wife of Lothair II, and also daughter of Rudolph II of Burgundy.

When Italy came under the direct control of the Holy Roman Empire in 962, Aleramo's titles were confirmed by the Emperor Otto I.

Family
Aleramo had three sons from his first wife, one Adelaide: 
 William II, died before 967, co-ruler with his father
 Otto, died 991. His son William III succeeded to Montferrat
 Anselm Ι, who succeeded to Liguria. He was the founder of the House of Del Vasto and fathered Anselm II of Liguria.

He was buried in Grazzano Badoglio, in the Province of Asti. His tomb, restored in the 16th and 20th centuries, is marked by a mosaic depicting mythological beasts.

Sources
 Circolo Culturale I Marchesi del Monferrato (external link to website devoted to dynastic history)

991 deaths
Liguria
Marquesses of Montferrat
10th-century Italian nobility
Aleramici
Year of birth unknown
People from Sezzadio
People from Grazzano Badoglio